Démophoon (sometimes spelt Démophon) is an opera by the composer Luigi Cherubini, first performed at the Académie Royale de Musique (the Paris Opera) on 2 December 1788. It takes the form of a tragédie lyrique in three acts. The libretto, by Jean-François Marmontel, is based on Demofoonte by Metastasio.

Performance history and reception
Démophoon was Cherubini's first French opera after his move from London to Paris. It was not a success and was soon eclipsed by Johann Christoph Vogel's opera on the same subject, which premiered the following year. The musicologist Basil Deane writes: "In retrospect it is easy to see that failure was inevitable. Marmontel based his French libretto on Metastasio, but sacrificed his predecessor's directness by introducing a superfluous sub-plot. Diffuse in structure, his text is pompously banal in language." The Italian Cherubini also had difficulty setting French and there are numerous examples of false accentuation. He was also only partially successful at changing his musical style from that of opera seria to one influenced by Christoph Willibald Gluck, who was then fashionable in France.

Some later critics have been much more enthusiastic about the score. E. J. Dent wrote, "Cherubini produced a French opera, Démophoon, which in its technical accomplishment is as masterly as anything of Mozart's. If any work ever deserved the epithet 'classical', it is Démophoon."

Roles

References

Sources
 Original libretto on Google Books
 Basil Deane, Cherubini, Oxford University Press, 1965
 Edward Joseph Dent The Rise of Romantic Opera (Cambridge University Press, 1979 edition)

Operas
Operas by Luigi Cherubini
French-language operas
1788 operas